The  took place on the night of 1 August 1945, as part of the strategic bombing campaign waged by the United States against military and civilian targets and population centers in the Japan home islands during the closing stages of World War II. Between 65.5 and 80 percent of the urban area of Nagaoka was destroyed during the bombing.

Background
Nagaoka was a regional commercial centre and home to one of the laboratories of Japan's Institute of Physical and Chemical Research. As of 1945 it had a population of around 67,000. While local lore held that Nagaoka was targeted because it was the hometown of Japanese Admiral Isoroku Yamamoto, who had directed the attack on Pearl Harbor, the presence of the chemical laboratory was more likely the reason the city was targeted.

Air raids

Nagaoka was attacked for the first time on 26 July 1945. The city was one of ten to be attacked during late July by the United States Army Air Forces' 509th Composite Group to practice the tactics the unit later used to conduct the atomic bombings of Hiroshima and Nagasaki. These raids were conducted by small groups of two to six Boeing B-29 Superfortress bombers armed with Pumpkin bombs. The 509th Composite Group assessed the results of the small attack on Nagaoka as having been "fair".

During the night of 27/28 July B-29s dropped leaflets on Nagaoka and ten other cities which stated that they would be subjected to attack, and that civilians should evacuate ahead of the raids. This tactic sought to intensify the psychological effects of the bombing campaign.

The main raid on Nagaoka occurred on 1 August 1945. Commencing at around 10:30 p.m. that night, 125 B-29 Superfortress bombers from the 313th Bombardment Wing struck the city with an estimated 163,000 incendiary bombs totaling 925 tons. The raid lasted for 1 hour and 40 minutes. The city suffered severe damage, though estimates of its extent vary: in 1953 the USAAF's official history stated that 65.5 percent of Nagaoka's urban area was destroyed, and this figure was also used by historian Richard B. Frank in 2001. However, in 2016 The Washington Post reported that 80 percent of Nagaoka had been burnt out. A total of 1,486 people were killed in Nagaoka, including more than 280 school age children. The American force that attacked Nagaoka did not suffer any casualties.

The cities of Toyama, Mito and Hachioki were also attacked on the night of 1/2 August, and suffered severe damage. The New York Times reported that the raids that night had included the largest number of bombs dropped up to that time.

Legacy
In November 1951 a bronze statue was erected at the Nagaoka railway station to commemorate the bombing and its victims. Called Heiwa-zo (Statue of Peace), it depicts a goddess with outstretched arms, a little girl with a ball, and a boy reading a book. Hidden in the bosom of the goddess is a copper plate engraved with the names of the schoolchildren who died in the air raid. The statue was moved to the Peace Forest Memorial Park in 1996.

Beginning in 2003, a fireworks display has been held annually on 1 August at 10:30 pm, the time the bombing occurred. Three shiragiku (white chrysanthemum fireworks) are launched "as an offering to the war dead". In 2015 the display featured an additional 2,000 fireworks.

See also
 Strategic bombing during World War II
 Evacuations of civilians in Japan during World War II

References
Citations

Works consulted

Further reading

External links

 67 Japanese Cities Firebombed in World War II

History of Niigata Prefecture
Nagaoka
1945 in Japan
Firebombings in Japan
Nagaoka, Niigata
Japan–United States military relations